Miguel González Pérez (27 April 1927 – 6 July 2021) was a Spanish football player and manager.

Career
Born in Santa Cruz de La Palma, González played as a striker for Mensajero, Iberia, Victoria, Atlético Madrid, Real Oviedo, Real Zaragoza and Real Murcia. With Atlético Madrid he scored 73 goals in 252 games, winning two league titles and one Cup.

He scored 2 goals in 15 games for the Spain national team between 1953 and 1958.

He later worked as a manager with Atlético Madrid (having previously served as assistant), Real Betis, Hércules and Getafe Deportivo.

He died on 6 July 2021 in Madrid, aged 94. At the time he was Atlético Madrid's oldest former player.

References

1927 births
2021 deaths
Spanish footballers
Association football forwards
Spain international footballers
CD Mensajero players
Atlético Madrid footballers
Real Oviedo players
Real Zaragoza players
Real Murcia players
La Liga players
Segunda División players
Spanish football managers
Atlético Madrid non-playing staff
Atlético Madrid managers
Real Betis managers
Hércules CF managers
People from La Palma
Sportspeople from the Province of Santa Cruz de Tenerife